Gwaelod-y-garth (Welsh for Foot of the Garth) is a village in the community of Pentyrch, Cardiff in Wales.

Location 
The castle of Castell Coch is within reach of the village, by car or on foot.

History 
In Elizabethan times, Gwaelod-y-Garth was noted for its iron-ore mines. The mines were opened between 1565 and 1625, and re-opened in the 19th century by the Blackmoor Booker company. In the early 1990s, a campaign was held to save the site.

The Pentyrch Iron Works was opened in Gwaelod-y-Garth in 1740 (Gwaelod-y-Garth was then in the parish of Pentyrch). It supplied iron to the Melingriffith Tin Plate Works in Whitchurch, about  downriver. In 1812 a tramway was constructed to the Mellingriffith Works; in 1871 this was upgraded to the standard-gauge Melingriffith and Pentyrch Railway. An Ordnance Survey map revised in 1915 shows the works as 'disused'. The forge from the ironworks was demolished in 1977 and the site is now used for housing.

Amenities 
Amenities include a Royal Mail collection point, Garth Tyres yard and a police car park, from where South Wales Police Roads Unit is run. There is also a large playing field named Heol Berry, where local amateur football team Gwaelod Rangers plays. At the top end of the village is the village pub, the Gwaelod Y Garth Inn. Situated in the village is Gwaelod-y-Garth Primary School, a school that educates through both the medium of Welsh and English. The students are separated into two sections of the school (English and Welsh). The village has a Welsh medium chapel called Bethlehem built in 1832.

Notable residents 
Dr. Mary Gillham, naturalist, one of the first women to visit Antarctica, in 1959.

See also 
Garth Mountain

References

External links 
 Pictures of Gwaelod-y-garth 
 Report on the iron workings
 www.geograph.co.uk : photos of Gwaelod-y-Garth and surrounding area
 Bethlehem Gwaelod-y-garth
 Gwaelod Rangers Football Club

Villages in Cardiff